Kang Bong-Kyu (Hangul: 강봉규, Hanja: 康奉珪) (born January 12, 1978 in Busan, South Korea) is an outfielder who played for the Samsung Lions in the Korea Baseball Organization. He bats and throws right-handed.
From 2017, he is the batting coach for the Samsung Lions

Amateur career
While attending Kyungnam High School, Kang was considered one of the best hitting pitchers in the Korean high school baseball league. In September , Kang was selected for the South Korea national junior baseball team to compete at the 3-Nation Junior Baseball Championship in Seoul, South Korea, along with Kim Sun-Woo, Seo Jae-Weong and Park Jin-Man.

However, in August  he was called up to the South Korea national junior baseball team again as a pitcher for the World Junior Baseball Championship held in Sancti Spiritus, Cuba.

In July 1997, as a sophomore at Korea University, Kang got his first call-up to the South Korea national baseball team for the team's five annual friendly matches against the USA national baseball team in California, United States.

In July 1998, as a junior, Kang was selected as a member of the South Korea national baseball team and led his team to runner-up at the 1998 Baseball World Cup as a starting third baseman.

In December 1998, as an amateur player, Kang was selected for the South Korea national team that won the gold medal in the baseball tournament of the 1998 Asian Games in Bangkok, Thailand. In the tourney, he served as a backup to KBO star Kim Dong-Joo at third base.

Notable international careers

Professional career
Over his career in the Bears Kang compiled a .240 batting average and 10 home runs.

2009
In 2009, Kang had the most brilliant season in his pro career. He played in 126 games, batted .310 with 20 home runs, 139 hits and 78 RBI, and posted career-highs in all the offensive categories, finishing in the top 10 of the league in 4 different offensive categories (sixth in runs and tenth in batting, on-base percentage and slugging percentage).

On September 25, Kang stole his 20th bases of the season in the first inning of Lions' final game of the 2009 season against Hanhwa Eagles to become a member of the 20-20 club.

Kang was selected as Samsung Lions' MVP of the year.

On December 11, 2009 at the 2009 Golden Gloves Award Ceremony, Kang was awarded "The Fair Play Trophy" and "Most Improved Player" by the KBO.

2010

Kang was selected as captain of Samsung Lions.

2011

On Oct. 31, 2011 in 5th game of 2011 Korean Series against SK Wyverns, Kang hit a solo home run to lead Samsung Lions to Korean Series Championship and was awarded the MVP of Game 5.

External links 
 Profile and stats on the KBO official site

1978 births
Asian Games gold medalists for South Korea
Asian Games medalists in baseball
Baseball players at the 1998 Asian Games
Doosan Bears players
KBO League outfielders
Korea University alumni
Kyungnam High School alumni
Living people
Medalists at the 1998 Asian Games
Samsung Lions players
South Korean baseball players
Sportspeople from Busan